The 2014 Jubilee Trophy was hosted in Vaughan, Ontario, from October 9 to 13, 2014. It is the Canadian national championship for women's amateur soccer teams.

Teams
 Surrey United 
 Edmonton Victoria 
 Action FC
 Scarborough GS United
 Vaughan Azzurri
 Delta de Laval 
 Halifax Dunbrack 
 Kirby United FC
Source:

Group stage
Teams were separated into two groups of four during the first stage of the tournament. All teams advanced to play the same-ranked team from the opposite group to determine a final seeding for the tournament.

Group A

Standings source:

Group B

Standings source:

Final round

References

Jubilee
Jubilee